The Suwon World Cup Stadium (수원월드컵경기장) is a football stadium located in Suwon, South Korea. It has been home of the K League 1 team Suwon Samsung Bluewings since 2001. The capacity of the stadium is 44,031.

Notable football events

2001 FIFA Confederations Cup

2002 FIFA World Cup
The Suwon World Cup Stadium was one of the venues of the 2002 FIFA World Cup, and held the following matches:

Gallery

References

External links

Official website 
Suwon Samsung Bluewings official website 
World Stadiums

2001 FIFA Confederations Cup stadiums in South Korea
2002 FIFA World Cup stadiums in South Korea
Sports venues in Suwon
Suwon Samsung Bluewings
Football venues in South Korea
Sports venues completed in 2001
K League 1 stadiums
K League 2 stadiums
2001 establishments in South Korea